Mr. North is a 1988 American comedy-drama film starring Anthony Edwards and featuring Robert Mitchum and Lauren Bacall, based on the novel Theophilus North (1973) by Thornton Wilder.

Directed by Danny Huston, the film became a family project; produced by John Huston, it also stars Anjelica Huston, Danny Huston's future wife Virginia Madsen, and Allegra Huston. Released a year after Jack Huston's death, the film marked his final film he wrote.

Plot
In 1920s Newport, Rhode Island, Theophilus North (Anthony Edwards) is an engaging, multi-talented, middle-class Yale University graduate who spends the summer catering to the wealthy families of the city. He becomes the confidant of James McHenry Bosworth (Robert Mitchum), and a tutor and tennis coach to the families' children. He also befriends many from the city's servant class including Henry Simmons (Harry Dean Stanton), Amelia Cranston (Lauren Bacall), and Sally Boffin (Virginia Madsen).

Complications arise when some residents begin to ascribe healing powers to the static electricity shocks that Mr. North happens to generate frequently. Despite never claiming any healing or medical abilities, he is accused of quackery, and with the help of those he has befriended, must defend himself.

In the end, Mr. North accepts a position of leadership at an educational and philosophical academy founded by Mr. Bosworth, and begins a romance with Bosworth's granddaughter Persis.

Cast
 Anthony Edwards as T. Theophilus North
 Robert Mitchum as James McHenry Bosworth
 Lauren Bacall as Amelia Cranston
 Harry Dean Stanton as Henry Simmons
 Anjelica Huston as Persis Bosworth-Tennyson
 Mary Stuart Masterson as Elspeth Skeel
 Virginia Madsen as Sally Boffin
 Tammy Grimes as Sarah Baily-Lewis
 David Warner as Dr. Angus McPherson
 Hunter Carson as Galloper Skeel
 Christopher Durang as YMCA clerk
 Mark Metcalf as George Skeel
 Katharine Houghton as Mrs. Skeel
 Thomas H. Needham as Judge Nicholas Catwalader
 Richard Woods as Willis
 Harriet Rogers as Tante Liselotte
 Layla Summers as Nadia Denby
 Lucas Hall as Joseph Denby
 Thomas-Laurence Hand as Luther Denby
 Linda Peterson as Mrs. Denby
 Cleveland Amory as Mr. Danforth
 Christopher Lawford as Michael Patrick Ennis III
 Marietta Tree as Amanda Venable

Production
Director Danny Huston brought the original script by James Costigan to his father for feedback, and John Huston rewrote it with his Prizzi's Honor co-author Janet Roach. Eugene Lee was the Production Designer.

Originally, John Huston was to play James McHenry Bosworth, but just after filming began, the illness that eventually killed him forced his withdrawal. He was quickly replaced by family friend Robert Mitchum.

Home media
When the film was released on VHS video in 1995, it was in its original format.  Later, when a DVD version was released, it had undergone an alteration in which the opening credits, visual sequence, and musical score were all edited and juggled around. Portions of the main character’s ride along the Rhode Island coast and countryside where he lives were deleted when the screen fades to a black overlay with newly redone credits for a period of one minute and fifty seconds.  The opening score was still used, but stretched to accommodate the altered length.  The streaming version of the film seems to be a direct copy of the DVD remaster and not the original theatrical version.

References

External links
 
 
 
 

1988 films
1980s fantasy comedy-drama films
1988 independent films
American fantasy comedy-drama films
American independent films
Films directed by Danny Huston
Films based on American novels
Films set in Rhode Island
Films set in the 1920s
Films shot in Rhode Island
Films with screenplays by John Huston
The Samuel Goldwyn Company films
Films produced by Steven Haft
1980s English-language films
1980s American films